The Gunnerales are an order of flowering plants. In the APG III system (2009) and APG IV system (2016) it contains two genera: Gunnera (in family Gunneraceae) and Myrothamnus (in family Myrothamnaceae). In the Cronquist system (1981), the Gunneraceae were in the Haloragales and Myrothamnaceae in the Hamamelidales.
DNA analysis was definitive, but the grouping of the two families was a surprise, given their very dissimilar morphologies. In Cronquist's old system (1981, 1988), and Takhtajan's (1997), the Gunneraceae were in the Rosidae, and the Myrothamnaceae were in the Hamamelids.
In modern classification systems such as APG III and APG IV this order was the first to derive from the core eudicots.

Description
Both families contain ellagic acid. Phloem cells contain a large number of plastids and the leaves have dented borders.

The plants are dioecious, have small flowers without perianth, and the stigma is at least weakly secretory. Gunnerales characters shared with the core of the eudicots are cyanogenesis via phenylalanine, metabolic pathways of isoleucine or valine, presence of the DNA sequence of PI-dB motif, 9 and is common to suffer a small deletion in the sequence of 18S ribosomal DNA. The characters which it shares with the core of eudicotyledons, and also with Buxales and Trochodendrales are: absence of benzylisoquinoline alkaloids, euAP3 + TM6 genes (gene duplication paleoAP3: Class B), and loss of the mitochondrial gene rps2.

Ecology
Despite being related, the Myrothamnaceae and the Gunneraceae look very different:
 The  Gunneraceae are a mesophilic herb (often oversized), and the hydathodes are well developed and secrete mucilage or perhaps a resinous coating.
 The  Myrothamnaceae are a reviviscent shrub of arid habitats, and the hydathodes are poorly developed and secrete plant resin.
Both have flowers without perianth, but the details of pollen (e.g. Zavada and Dilcher see 1986 10, Wanntorp et al. 2004th 2004b 11 and 12) differ. In Wilkinson 2000 13 is a table of differences.

References

External links
Gunnerales in Stevens, P. F. (2001 onwards). Angiosperm Phylogeny Website. Version 7, May 2006.

 
Angiosperm orders
Dioecious plants